The 1919 Maine Black Bears football team was an American football team that represented the University of Maine during the 1919 college football season. In its first season under head coach James A. Baldwin, the team compiled a 6–1 record.  Clyde Stewart was the team captain.

Schedule

References

Maine
Maine Black Bears football seasons
Maine Black Bears football